Cullenstown is a townland and small village located on the south coast of County Wexford, in Ireland. A small beach, Cullenstown Strand, is located nearby.

Cullenstown is home to the "shell cottage" (also known as "cliff cottage"), a 19th century thatched farmhouse which was decorated with shells by Kevin Ffrench. The house took over 30 years to decorate. The area also contains a Gaelic handball alley, a pub, and a number of holiday homes.

See also
 List of towns and villages in Ireland

References

Towns and villages in County Wexford